The Midwest Old Threshers Reunion is an annual event that takes place in the small town of Mt. Pleasant, Iowa, United States, and runs for five days, ending on the Labor Day weekend. It was first held in 1950, and has taken place every year except 2020, when it was cancelled  due to the COVID-19 pandemic. When it first started, it focused on steam engines and antique agricultural equipment, but has developed into an entertainment event with a wider remit. The tiny town of less than 10,000 inhabitants receives thousands of visitors from around the world.

Old Threshers Reunion, as an event, attracts visitors from around the world,  attracted by both the permanent exhibits on the reunion grounds and by the collections of antique and steam powered equipment brought to the show by other visitors.

Permanent Exhibits 

The Heritage Museum is open year-round, featuring a variety of exhibits that celebrate the rural heritage of the midwest.

The Stationary steam engine exhibit features three large Corliss engines as well as a number of smaller engines.

The Midwest Electric Railway operates a  trolley line around the reunion campground.  A number of well restored Iowa trolleys operate on this line, including Waterloo Car 381, the last trolley to operate in public service in Iowa and Car 9 from the Albia Interurban Line.  MERA also operates Car 320, a beautiful wooden interurban from the Chicago Aurora and Elgin line in IL.  Additional favorite cars come from as far away as Rio de Janeiro, Brazil and Milan, Italy.  
 

The Midwest Central Railroad operates a  narrow gauge railway around the reunion exhibit area.  This railroad features a 3-truck Shay locomotive from the West Side Lumber Company railway.  Other engines include two 2-6-0 Baldwin engines (one having a recently updated boiler and the other undergoing extensive rework) that formerly served logging railroads in the eastern United States and a German 0-4-0 built by Henschel & Son. For routine operations, there are two Plymouth Locomotive Works diesel switch engines, one of them run if there's something wrong with one of the two trains that run each day, and a Vulcan Iron Works gasoline switch engine.
 In addition to operating during the reunion, the Midwest Central Railroad has public
events connected to Independence Day, Halloween and Christmas.

The Hazel Grace Pierson Carousel Pavilion houses a beautiful fully restored antique carousel.  "The Smile Machine" is powered by a Herschell-Spillman steam engine that dates back over a century.  The carousel includes a Military Band Organ, as well as the usual rocking horses.

Reunion Venues 

During the show, the village and train station at Snipe Run on the north side of the reunion grounds is an active place, as is the log village at the south end of the trolley line.  Major exhibit areas are reserved for small Steam Engines, steam traction engines, Gas Engines, crafts, food, and demonstrations to look at how things were done in the days of old.  At noon every day of the reunion, there is a parade of power, where all the operating steam and gas traction engines parade by the grandstand.

There are two main events every night of the reunion week. In the early evening, the Schaffner Players perform an old "Toby and Susie" Toby Tolliver play  in the Theatre Museum, after which there is a concert in the pavilion. The Reunion has succeeded in attracting acts including Minnie Pearl, Leroy Van Dyke, Tammy Wynette, George Strait, Johnny Cash & June Carter, Kenny Rogers, Brad Paisley, Terri Clark, Willie Nelson and LeAnn Rimes, who have all performed on the pavilion stage.

Map of the grounds 
 
 An alternative map

References

External links 

Old Threshers Homepage (identical to )

Festivals in Iowa
Tourist attractions in Henry County, Iowa
Museums in Henry County, Iowa
Open-air museums in Iowa
Steam museums in the United States
History museums in Iowa
Agriculture museums in the United States